Let's Do It Again is a 1975 American action crime comedy film starring Sidney Poitier and co-starring Bill Cosby and Jimmie Walker among an all-star black cast. The film, directed by Poitier, is about blue-collar workers who decide to rig a boxing match to raise money for their fraternal lodge. The song of the same name by The Staple Singers was featured as the opening and ending theme of the film, and as a result, the two have become commonly associated with each other. The production companies include Verdon Productions and The First Artists Production Company, Ltd., and distributed by Warner Bros. The movie was filmed in two cities, Atlanta, Georgia and New Orleans, Louisiana, where most of the plot takes place. This was the second film pairing of Poitier and Cosby following Uptown Saturday Night, and followed by A Piece of the Action (1977). Of the three, Let's Do It Again has been the most successful both critically and commercially. Calvin Lockhart and Lee Chamberlin also appeared in Uptown Saturday Night. According to the American Film Institute, Let's Do It Again is not a sequel to Uptown Saturday Night.

Plot
Two friends, Billy Foster and Clyde Williams, need to quickly find a way to raise funds for their fraternal lodge, the Sons and Daughters of Shaka. It is incumbent on Billy to find the money because he is the treasurer of the struggling lodge. After Billy convinces Clyde that it is their best and quickest option, they decide to bring back a successful money-making scheme, hence the title. Clyde's special ability of hypnosis allows the two to set up boxing matches and then maximize profits by going all in on the underdog. Billy and Clyde take their talents to New Orleans along with their wives, Beth and Dee Dee to rig a boxing match. This is where Jimmie Walker's character, Bootney Farnsworth, comes into the fold. Bootney is lanky boxer that is overwhelmed in the initial sparring matches. His difficulty to impress anyone, even his coach, makes the odds of him winning lower by the day. 

After watching Bootney struggle, Billy and Clyde are encouraged to go through with their plan. Before the match, they sneak into Bootney's hotel room and hypnotize him, before they hilariously escape. They use what's left of the lodge's budget to place their bets with local bookmakers, Kansas City Mack and Biggie Smalls. The hypnotized Bootney has transformed into a boxing phenomenon and easily defeats the champion, 40th Street Black, by KO. 

After collecting their money and returning to Atlanta to celebrate at the lodge, they soon receive a visit from Kansas City Mack. Mack grew suspicious of the duo's conveniently-timed bet, and after finally catching on, he spent weeks searching for the two best friends. Once he arrives at the lodge, he makes a deal that would allow the two sides be even. Billy and Clyde must perform exactly the same hypnosis on a boxer, but this time they must collude with Mack. Billy and Clyde agree to the initial deal, but Clyde has a hard time de-hypnotizing Bootney. Bootney, still under hypnosis, has become far too quick for Clyde to keep up with and de-hypnotize. Unable to enter Farnsworth's training room to dehypnotize him, which in turn would cause him to lose the fight, Williams and Foster decide to bet on the match being a draw, and place bets with both gangster groups by using Beth and Dee Dee, who will not be recognized. They decide to hypnotize Bootney's opponent, in order to capitalize on an outrageous bet no one would think of, a tie. 

Following the stunning outcome, Billy and Clyde are nowhere to be found. Outraged, Kansas City Mack and rival bookmaker, Biggie Smalls, team up in order to track the two down. Billy and Clyde lead them on a chase that ends up at the local police department. Here, the lead officer tells the two bookmakers that if he ever hears they have harassed Billy and Clyde or if the two come up missing, they will be thrown in jail for a very long time. The movie finishes with Billy, Clyde, Beth and Dee Dee driving back home to Atlanta. Billy jokes that they should rig a fight involving heavyweight champion, Muhammad Ali and entertainer Sammy Davis Jr.

Cast

When the film premiered, John Amos and Jimmie Walker were starring as father and son in the CBS sitcom Good Times. George Foreman makes a cameo appearance as a factory worker who challenges Billy to a fight in the beginning of the film. Jayne Kennedy also makes a cameo during the opening credits as the beautiful Girl at the Factory that Billy is looking at when he crashes his forklift.

Background 
The film's writer, Richard Wesley, also wrote the first film that featured Cosby and Poitier as co-stars, Uptown Saturday Night. Wesley's repertoire includes a range of black power films and plays. Wesley is responsible for a 1971 play Black Terror, which portrayed the story of a black revolution that was to take place in "the very near future" and a 1989 play The Talented Tenth which takes its name from W. E. B. Du Bois's article, "The Talented Tenth". Like Wesley, the film's producer, Melville Tucker, too worked on Uptown Saturday Night. Tucker worked with Poitier prior to both films as well in The Lost Man (1969). The Lost Man is black power film about group of black militants that hatch a plan to finance their "revolutionary struggle". In order to succeed in this mission, the group conspires to rob a factory.

The DVD contains a commentary feature that includes Richard Wesley and New York Press film critic Armond White. Wesley mentions that the film was important to Poitier's image. The film allowed Poitier to expand his now "distant" image and answer criticism from black militants and the younger generation. Working with younger actors, like Jimmie Walker, was an important factor in widening Poitier's audience. Jimmie Walker's character welcomed Poitier to "new black humor". Wesley also mentions that Bill Cosby and Sidney Poitier were not the original lead actors he had in mind when writing the script. Instead, he thought of casting Richard Pryor and Redd Foxx. This did not come to fruition, as Warners Bros. wanted actors more known to mainstream America. Pryor and Foxx had some success but Poitier was seen as a more viable lead actor. In the end, Wesley was pleased with the actors that lead the film, because Poitier and Cosby worked so well together. Wesley points out that the friendship off-screen translated to the film. Though, Poitier and Cosby had two very different acting styles, their chemistry was what boosted the script. Cosby and Poitier were joined by other actors that worked together previously. John Amos, Jimmie Walker, and Mel Stewart had all worked with an actor, producer or director prior to Let's Do It Again.

Themes 
The attire in the film resembles much of what is seen in the blaxploitation era. In the DVD's commentary, film critic Armond White points out that the suits were worn by Kansas City Mack and co. to parody blaxploitation. Extravagant, if not gaudy, suits and gold jewelry are blaxploitation staples. White also mentions that Bill Cosby satirizes the attire of blaxploitation in just one scene. Cosby wears a flamboyant red and pink suit in an attempt to impress prominent bookmaker Kansas City Mack (John Amos). Writer Chris Laverty went into more detail about clothing and their importance in a journal for Arts Illustrated: "In a sense it was social progression, the essence of the self-made man; readable entirely by what he wears. Narrative was indirectly powered by the coveting of clothes as visual representation of having 'made it'". It is also worth noting that Mack's entourage has either relaxed hair or a shaved head. Afros are not often seen on the heads of elite African-American businessmen. Afros are blaxploitation staples and is seen on the head of Bill Cosby, while Sidney Poitier has a lower cut.

The role of women in the film was a priority of Wesley. In the film's commentary, he admitted that women were "underutilized" in Uptown Saturday Night. In Let's Do it Again, the significant others of Billy and Clyde are more visible throughout the movie and play a larger role in the denouement of the film. Women are more visible in their relations to other characters as well. Wesley points out that an antagonist, Biggie Smalls, has a female head honcho. Mature relationships between black men and women that may have been "soured" by the time was another reason for Wesley increasing the role of women in the film. Richard wanted to improve the image of black community. To him, this improvement began in the portrayal of the household. Let's Do It Again came at when films that starred powerful, black female leads, such as Coffy and Foxy Brown, were being released. Wesley decided to take a different route and use black, female characters as companions to male leads.

Self-determination is another theme present in the film. The film showed characters taking charge of their own lives. This idea that each individual controls their own life is another common theme in the Black Power movement and was central to lectures by Black Power leaders such as Malcolm X and Martin Luther King Jr.

Soundtrack 
The soundtrack to the film was put together by world-renowned musician Curtis Mayfield. Mayfield, also responsible for the highly-successful soundtrack in Super Fly (1972), wrote the music and The Staple Singers performed the songs. The title track for this movie entitled, "Let's Do It Again", was a number one hit on both the R&B and Pop charts. Wesley credited much of the film's success to the success of the song, which was released prior to the film's debut. The music also resembles much of what is seen in blaxploitation. Upbeat funk with horns and syncopated drum beats are heard in black cinema films throughout the 1960s-1970's.

 "Let's Do It Again"
 "Funky Love"
 "A Whole Lot of Love"
 "New Orleans"
 "I Want to Thank You"
 "Big Mac"
 "After Sex"
 "Chase" (Quinton Joseph, Phillip Upchurch, Gary Thompson, Floyd Morris, Joseph Scott, Mayfield)

Reception
The revenue is listed at $11.8 million and was one of the highest-grossing films of 1975.

Roger Ebert gave it 3 out of 4 stars, saying that it "isn't a terribly ambitious comedy, but within its limitations it works well". Gene Siskel also awarded 3 stars out of 4 and wrote: "After making Uptown Saturday Night, Cosby said that he wasn't satisfied with the picture even though it was selling well. He said he wanted to use the same gang and do it once more, but better. That's been accomplished, and there's no reason to stop at two. Cosby and Poitier have broad humor down pat; I'd like to see them get witty". Richard Eder of The New York Times wrote that the action "is familiar stuff, but some of it is pretty funny" and found Cosby in particular "hilarious". Variety wrote: "The gang from Uptown Saturday Night encores successfully in Let's Do It Again, a funny, free-form farcical revue reminiscent in substance of classic Hal Roach comedy". Kevin Thomas of the Los Angeles Times said: "At 112 minutes, Let's Do It Again is extraordinarily long for a comedy, yet its humor is sustained throughout, thanks to Wesley's ingenuity and to the fine ensemble playing of a large cast under Poitier's affectionate direction". Jonathan Rosenbaum of The Monthly Film Bulletin wrote: "Despite a frankly nonsensical plot full of formula antics and an unnecessarily protracted running time, Let's Do It Again is a healthy reminder of the relative verve, energy and talent to be found nowadays in the so-called 'black exploitation' film—a somewhat loaded term considering the fact that no one ever speaks of 'white exploitation' and particularly inappropriate in relation to such a high-spirited yet unassuming entertainment as this".

Rotten Tomatoes gives it a rating of 63% based on reviews from eight critics. The film also won all five NAACP Image Awards for which it received a nomination. The film earned $6 million in theatrical rentals in North America.

References to Richard Wesley's life 
In the DVD's commentary, Wesley admits that several scenes and characters are references to his life, more specifically his childhood. 40th Street Black was the nickname of a kid at a camp Richard's brother attended. Jimmie Walker's character, "Bootney" was another reference to his life. Wesley grew up knowing two brothers named "Lil Bootney and Big Bootney". Wesley mentions that the two were known as fighters within the community.

In popular culture 
 The late Brooklyn rap artist The Notorious B.I.G. took his alias, Biggie Smalls, from Calvin Lockhart's character in this film. However, the alias could not be used as his name due to ownership issues.
 East Coast rap group Camp Lo titled their second album Let's Do It Again; their debut album was titled Uptown Saturday Night, a reference to the two Cosby and Poitier films.
 Musician/MTV personality Fonzworth Bentley took his stage name from Jimmie Walker's character, Bootney Farnsworth.

Remake
Will Smith and his production company, Overbrook Entertainment, secured the rights in 2002 to the trilogy for remakes to star Smith and to be distributed by Warner Bros. Smith hoped to get Eddie Murphy, Martin Lawrence and other famous African-American stars for the films.

See also
 List of American films of 1975

References

External links
 
 
 
 

1975 films
1970s action comedy films
1970s buddy comedy films
1970s crime comedy films
1970s sports comedy films
1970s crime action films
American action comedy films
American buddy comedy films
American crime comedy films
American crime action films
American independent films
American sports comedy films
Blaxploitation films
American boxing films
1970s English-language films
Films about gambling
Films directed by Sidney Poitier
Films shot in New Orleans
First Artists films
Warner Bros. films
1975 comedy films
African-American films
1970s American films